Terence Lee "Terry" Etim (born 11 January 1986) is a retired  English mixed martial artist who  competed as a lightweight. He is trained by Shyam Sundar and Reddy Sai Naren. Etim is a brown belt in Luta Livre under Marcelo Brigadeiro.

Mixed martial arts career

Early career
Terry became the Cage Gladiators Lightweight Champion by defeating Greg Loughran via rear naked choke in the second round and successfully defended his title against Sami Berik, again winning in the second round via arm bar.

Etim's fight with Spain's Diego Gonzalez was refereed by former boxing World Heavyweight Champion Mike Tyson, during the World Cage Fighting Championships at the MEN Arena in Manchester, England in March 2006. Etim won the fight via triangle choke in the first round.

Ultimate Fighting Championship
Etim trained with Pride veteran Luciano Azevedo in Brazil in preparation for his UFC debut fight against Matt Grice at UFC 70 in Manchester. After an opening flurry that rocked Grice, Etim jumped in with a flying knee that was blocked and caused him to fall to the canvas. From there, Grice worked his ground and pound attack, but once the fight was stood up, Etim turned the tables and locked in a standing guillotine. Etim dragged Grice down to the ground whilst in the guillotine. But this allowed Grice to escape briefly, before Etim got Grice in another guillotine choke. Grice fell unconscious in the choke and referee Steve Mazzagatti called the fight with 12 seconds left of the opening round.

Etim was defeated at UFC 75 by Gleison Tibau via unanimous decision. Etim was controlled on the ground by Tibau for the length of the fight, eliciting boos from the English crowd.

In his next fight, Etim received his second career loss and his second loss in a row against veteran fighter Rich Clementi at UFC 84 in a similar manner.

Etim snapped his two fight losing streak with a one-sided unanimous decision victory over Sam Stout at UFC 89 in Birmingham, England. Combining precise kicks with fast hands and a precise jab, Etim controlled Stout through the duration of the fight, only having to fend off sporadic and often desperate bursts from the Canadian in reply.

Terry posted his second win in as many fights, as he stopped former Palace Fighting Championship lightweight titleholder Brian Cobb via TKO in the second round. The defeat snapped Cobb's nine-fight winning streak. Etim appeared to win the first round, using leg kicks effectively. When the fight went to the ground Cobb failed to score points, as Etim avoided damage on the ground. Early in round two Etim dropped Cobb with a head kick before finishing the fight with punches, forcing the referee to stop the fight.

Terry survived a first-round knockdown and broken nose to defeat Justin Buchholz at UFC 99 via D'Arce choke in the second round. Etim collected $60,000 for Submission of the Night. Buchholz and Etim traded heavy kicks and punches for the first few minutes in the bout before the American landed a hard right hand which broke Etim's nose. Buchholz pounced but Etim was able to survive the round. Etim went back to his measured gameplan in round two, landing with some hard leg kicks, before hurting Buchholz with multiple knees from the clinch. A scramble ensued before the fight went to the mat, enabling Etim to lock in the D'Arce choke to finish the fight.

Etim won his third Submission of the Night award after defeating Shannon Gugerty on 14 November 2009 at UFC 105 by submission due to a guillotine choke at 1:24 of the second round.

Etim fought BJJ black belt Rafael dos Anjos on 10 April 2010 at UFC 112. After a back and forth first round, where Etim almost submitted dos Anjos with a guillotine choke, he succumbed to the Brazilian's grappling skills in the second, tapping out to an armbar.

Etim was expected to face Joe Lauzon on 28 August 2010 at UFC 118, but was forced off the card with an injury and replaced by Gabe Ruediger.

Etim gave an announcement on 23 June 2011 in an interview on mma-weekly stating that after a year healing from a broken rib injury he will be fighting soon. He said: "as soon as I get a date I will fight." "as soon as i get the phone call I'm ready to go."

Etim fought Edward Faaloloto on 5 November 2011 at UFC 138 Etim showed his superior ground skills as he submitted Faaloloto with a guillotine choke 17 seconds into the fight, earning his fourth career Submission of the Night award (tying the UFC's all-time mark).

Etim faced Edson Barboza on 14 January 2012 at UFC 142. The two fought at a steady pace during the match with Barboza throwing more strikes while Etim went for takedowns. Etim was then knocked out in the third round by a spinning wheel kick. Both participants earned Fight of the Night honors for their performances.

Etim was expected to face Joe Lauzon on 4 August 2012 at UFC on Fox 4. However, Etim was forced out of the bout with an injury and replaced by Jamie Varner.

After a thirteen-month layoff, Etim returned to face Renée Forte on 16 February 2013 at UFC on Fuel TV: Barão vs. McDonald. Etim lost the fight via unanimous decision and was subsequently released from the promotion.

Bellator MMA
Following his exit from the UFC, Etim signed with Bellator, originally set to debut on the promotion's first ever PPV event. He eventually faced Patrick Cenoble on the Spike TV at Bellator 109 on 22 November 2013. He won the fight via unanimous decision (30–27, 29–28, and 30–26). In 2014 he was due to take part in a Bellator lightweight tourney but was forced out after injuring his ACL.

Personal life
In February 2017, Etim was reported to have thrown himself into oncoming traffic while running amok in Liverpool.

Championships and accomplishments
Ultimate Fighting Championship
Fight of the Night (One time) 
Submission of the Night (Four times) 
Submission of the Year (2009)

Mixed martial arts record

|-
| Win
| align=center| 16–5
| Patrick Cenoble
| Decision (unanimous)
| Bellator 109
| 
| align=center| 3
| align=center| 5:00
| Bethlehem, Pennsylvania, United States
|
|-
| Loss
| align=center| 15–5
| Renée Forte
| Decision (unanimous)
| UFC on Fuel TV: Barão vs. McDonald
| 
| align=center| 3 
| align=center| 5:00 
| London, England
|
|-
| Loss
| align=center| 15–4
| Edson Barboza
| KO (wheel kick)
| UFC 142
| 
| align=center| 3
| align=center| 2:02
| Rio de Janeiro, Brazil
| 
|-
| Win
| align=center| 15–3
| Edward Faaloloto
| Submission (guillotine choke)
| UFC 138
| 
| align=center| 1
| align=center| 0:17
| Birmingham, England
| 
|-
| Loss
| align=center| 14–3
| Rafael dos Anjos
| Submission (armbar)
| UFC 112
| 
| align=center| 2
| align=center| 4:30
| Abu Dhabi, United Arab Emirates
| 
|-
| Win
| align=center| 14–2
| Shannon Gugerty
| Submission (guillotine choke)
| UFC 105
| 
| align=center| 2
| align=center| 1:24
| Manchester, England
| 
|-
| Win
| align=center| 13–2
| Justin Buchholz
| Submission (D'Arce choke)
| UFC 99
| 
| align=center| 2
| align=center| 2:38
| Cologne, Germany
| 
|-
| Win
| align=center| 12–2
| Brian Cobb
| TKO (head kick and punches)
| UFC 95
| 
| align=center| 2
| align=center| 0:10
| London, England
| 
|-
| Win
| align=center| 11–2
| Sam Stout
| Decision (unanimous)
| UFC 89
| 
| align=center| 3
| align=center| 5:00
| Birmingham, England
| 
|-
| Loss
| align=center| 10–2
| Rich Clementi
| Decision (unanimous)
| UFC 84
| 
| align=center| 3
| align=center| 5:00
| Las Vegas, Nevada, United States
| 
|-
| Loss
| align=center| 10–1
| Gleison Tibau
| Decision (unanimous)
| UFC 75
| 
| align=center| 3
| align=center| 5:00
| London, England
| 
|-
| Win
| align=center| 10–0
| Matt Grice
| Technical Submission (guillotine choke)
| UFC 70
| 
| align=center| 1
| align=center| 4:38
| Manchester, England
| 
|-
| Win
| align=center| 9–0
| Sami Berik
| Submission (armbar)
| Cage Gladiators 3
| 
| align=center| 2
| align=center| 1:24
| Liverpool, England
| 
|-
| Win
| align=center| 8–0
| Edgars Podnieks
| Submission (rear-naked choke)
| RTT: Road to Tokyo
| 
| align=center| 1
| align=center| 0:46
| Wolverhampton, England
| 
|-
| Win
| align=center| 7–0
| Greg Loughran
| Submission (rear-naked choke)
| CG II: The Next Generation
| 
| align=center| 2
| align=center| 2:50
| Liverpool, England
| 
|-
| Win
| align=center| 6–0
| Danny van Bergen
| Submission (armbar)
| Cage Gladiators 1
| 
| align=center| 1
| align=center| 0:50
| Liverpool, England
| 
|-
| Win
| align=center| 5–0
| Diego Conejo
| Submission (triangle choke)
| WCFC: No Guts No Glory
| 
| align=center| 1
| align=center| 0:59
| Manchester, England
| 
|-
| Win
| align=center| 4–0
| Kamel Nacer
| Submission (triangle choke)
| CFC 6: Cage Carnage
| 
| align=center| 1
| align=center| N/A
| Liverpool, England
| 
|-
| Win
| align=center| 3–0
| Aaron Blackwell
| Submission (guillotine choke)
| CFC 5: Cage Carnage
| 
| align=center| 1
| align=center| 0:58
| Liverpool, England
| 
|-
| Win
| align=center| 2–0
| Neil Barber
| KO (head kick)
| CFC 4: Cage Carnage
| 
| align=center| 2
| align=center| 1:55
| Liverpool, England
| 
|-
| Win
| align=center| 1–0
| Kris Leverton
| Submission (triangle choke)
| Ultimate Ring Fighting
| 
| align=center| 1
| align=center| N/A
| Stockport, England
|

References

External links

1986 births
Living people
British catch wrestlers
English male mixed martial artists
English Muay Thai practitioners
Lightweight mixed martial artists
Mixed martial artists utilizing catch wrestling
Mixed martial artists utilizing Luta Livre
Mixed martial artists utilizing Muay Thai
Martial artists from Liverpool
Ultimate Fighting Championship male fighters